Carmen Hunter (born 1978) is a former Australian high jump champion and national record holder.  In 2001, she won the Australian National Championships held in Brisbane.

Carmen won her first national title aged 12 at the Australia Little Athletics Championships held in Canberra, 1991.  She went on to claim further Australian titles and represented Australia at minor international track and field championships.

Carmen's performance at the 1992 Australian All Schools Championships held in Perth, where she won the U15 title with a jump of 1.85m, has seen her cited in the "absolute world records" listing for the best performance by female aged 14.11.

Achievements

References 

1978 births
Living people
Australian female high jumpers
Sportswomen from the Northern Territory
University of Queensland alumni
20th-century Australian women
21st-century Australian women